Walthamstow West was a borough constituency in what is now the London Borough of Waltham Forest, but was until 1965 the Walthamstow Urban District of Essex. It returned one Member of Parliament (MP) to the House of Commons of the Parliament of the United Kingdom.

The constituency was created for the 1918 general election, and abolished for the February 1974 general election, when it was combined with part of the former Walthamstow East to form the new Walthamstow constituency.

Boundaries 
1918–1950: The Urban District of Walthamstow wards of High Street, Higham Hill, and St James Street.

1950–1974: The Municipal Borough of Walthamstow wards of High Street, Higham Hill, and St James Street.

Members of Parliament

Election results

Elections in the 1910s

Elections in the 1920s

Elections in the 1930s

Election in the 1940s

Elections in the 1950s

Elections in the 1960s

Election in the 1970s

References 

Parliamentary constituencies in London (historic)
Constituencies of the Parliament of the United Kingdom established in 1918
Constituencies of the Parliament of the United Kingdom disestablished in 1974
Constituencies of the Parliament of the United Kingdom represented by a sitting Prime Minister
Politics of the London Borough of Waltham Forest
Walthamstow